Zygaena minos is a member of the family Zygaenidae. It is found in most of Europe, except Ireland, Great Britain, the Benelux, the Iberian Peninsula and Norway.
It is very similar to Zygaena purpuralis with which it forms a species complex and only separable by genital preparation or by the larval foodplant. The wingspan is 33–37 mm. It flies in June and July.The white-gray larvae feed on Pimpinella saxifraga and Eryngium species.

The species is only found in a few places in Denmark, and the population there is slowly declining.

Subspecies
Zygaena minos minos
Zygaena minos normanna Verity 1922
Zygaena minos peloponnesica Holik, 1937
Zygaena minos sareptensis Rebel, 1901
Zygaena minos viridescens Burgeff, 1926

References

Bibliography
Top-Jensen, M. & M. Fibiger. 2009. Danmarks sommerfugle. Bugbook Publisher. .

Zygaena
Moths of Europe
Moths described in 1775